Laurent Cugny (born 14 April 1955 in La Garenne-Colombes) is a French jazz musician (pianist, bandleader, composer and arranger), jazz critic and musicologist. In 1987, he recorded two albums with his big band Lumière and Gil Evans.

Awards
DjangodOr as composer (2009)
DjangodOr as leader of the Orchestre National de Jazz (1997)
Prix Django Reinhardt (1989)

Discography

With Gil Evans
Rhythm A Ning (EmArcy, 1988)
Golden Hair (EmArcy, 1989)

Laurent Cugny Big Band Lumière
Dromesko  (EmArcy, 1993)

References

People from La Garenne-Colombes
1955 births
Living people
20th-century French musicologists
21st-century French musicologists
French jazz pianists
French male pianists
French music critics
French male non-fiction writers
French jazz bandleaders
French music arrangers
21st-century pianists
21st-century French male musicians
French male jazz musicians
Orchestre National de Jazz members